The Cineteca di Bologna is a film archive in Bologna, Italy. It was founded on 18 May 1962.

Since 1989, it has been a member of the Fédération internationale des archives du film (FIAF). It has been a member of the Association des cinémathèques européennes (ACE) since its creation.

Since March 2014, its president is Italian movie director Marco Bellocchio and its director is Gian Luca Farinelli.

L’Immagine Ritrovata 

"...Cineteca di Bologna, one of the world’s major film archives, whose L’Immagine Ritrovata lab has been restoring and preserving the legacy of cinema for over twenty-five years. Its restorations regularly premiere at major festivals such as Cannes and Venice before heading out to repertory theaters around the world."—The Criterion Collection, 2018

Laboratorio L'immagine Ritrovata in Bologna, Italy, was founded in 1992, and owned by the Cineteca di Bologna, with branches, L'Image Retrouvée, in Paris, and L’Immagine Ritrovata Asia, in Hong Kong. 80 people restore around 140 films yearly. Fédération International des Archives du Film Film Restoration Summer School is a three-week programme; one week of "theoretical panels" during the Il Cinema Ritrovato Festival, and two weeks of hands-on at L'Immagine Ritrovata for 40 students.

Festivals 

Among the various shows and festivals organized by the Cineteca di Bologna are: Il Cinema Ritrovato, Visioni Italiane and Human Rights Nights Film Festival.

Il Cinema Ritrovato 

Il Cinema Ritrovato is a movie festival dedicated to the rediscovery of rare and not well-known movies, with particular interest to the first cinematographic productions.
It has been held since 1986 and it presents a precious selection of rare movies or works that are considered lost, recovered from historical archives of many countries, and sometimes even restored films. The movies are projected in various places throughout the historical centre of Bologna, including Piazza Maggiore.

From 2001 until his death in 2014, the artistic director of the festival was Finnish film critic Peter von Bagh. The silent cinema critic Vittorio Martinelli also worked with the festival until his death in 2008.

The current directors of the festival are Gian Luca Farinelli, Mariann Lewinsky, Cecilia Cenciarelli and Ehsan Khoshbakht.

See also 
 List of film archives

References

External links 
 

Film archives in Italy